Hidden Guns is a 1956 American Western film directed by Albert C. Gannaway and written by Samuel Roeca and Albert C. Gannaway. The film stars Bruce Bennett, Richard Arlen, John Carradine, Faron Young, Lloyd Corrigan and Angie Dickinson. The film was released on January 30, 1956, by Republic Pictures.

Plot

An entire town is afraid of a man called Stragg, a wealthy and ruthless saloon owner who employs hired guns and has cheated many of the citizens out of their money and land. The only man who stands up to Stragg is the popular sheriff, Ward Young, but no one, including Ward's son, deputy Faron, is willing to side with him against the powerful Stragg.

When a law is changed that will strip Ward of his authority within 48 hours, he becomes determined to put Stragg behind bars as his last act. He seeks out Burt Miller, brother of a man Stragg has had murdered. On a stagecoach ride with Miller, his witness, accompanied by Doc Carter's beautiful daughter, Becky, another passenger listens to their conversation. He is a gunslinger named Snipe Harding, who has been hired by Stragg to kill the sheriff and the witness.

Snipe recognizes that killing Ward will be difficult, knowing him to be a fast draw. After he kills Miller, he persuades Stragg to challenge the sheriff to a showdown in front of everyone in town. When the men draw, Snipe shoots the sheriff from a hiding place. Doc Carter and others can only conclude that Ward was shot in a fair fight.

Faron, however, is suspicious, and Doc's examination proves that the sheriff was shot with a rifle, not a pistol. He goes gunning for Snipe, killing him, and the townspeople come to his aid when Stragg attempts to flee.

Cast
Bruce Bennett as Stragg
Richard Arlen as Sheriff Ward Young
John Carradine as Snipe Harding
Faron Young as Deputy Faron Young
Lloyd Corrigan as Judge Wallis
Angie Dickinson as Becky Carter
Damian O'Flynn as Kingsley
Irving Bacon as Doc Carter
Tom Hubbard as Grundy
Ron Gans as Burt Miller 
Bill Ward as Joe Miller
Lee Morgan as Emmett Harding 
Edmund Cobb as Ben Williams
Ben Welden as Ben Peabody
Guinn "Big Boy" Williams as Kingford
Gordon Terry as Terry
Charles Heard as Stage Stop Attendant
Bill Coontz as Dave 
Michael Darrin as Hank

References

External links 
 

1956 films
American Western (genre) films
1956 Western (genre) films
Republic Pictures films
1950s English-language films
Films directed by Albert C. Gannaway
1950s American films
American black-and-white films